Olza may refer to:

Olza (river), a river in the Czech Republic and Poland
Olza, Silesian Voivodeship, a village in Poland
Cendea de Olza/Oltza Zendea, a municipality in Spain
SS Olza, a Polish ship